"Qunut" is a supplication type of prayer made while standing in Islam.

Etymology 
"Qunūt" literally means "being obedient" or "the act of standing" in Classical Arabic. The word duʿā' is Arabic for supplication, so the longer phrase duʿā' qunūt is sometimes used.

Qunut has many linguistic meanings, such as humility, obedience and devotion. However, it is more understood to be a special du'a which is recited during the prayer.

Customs 

It is permissible to make the qunut before going into ruku (bowing), or it may be recited when one stands up straight after the ruku. Humaid says: "I asked Anas: 'Is the qunut before or after the ruku?' he said: 'We would do it before or after." This hadith was related by Ibn Majah and Muhammad ibn Nasr. In Fath al-Bari, Ibn Hajar al-Asqalani comments that its chain is faultless.

The minority Ibadi school of Islam rejects the practice of qunūt altogether. However, it is normative in all daily prayers among the Twelver Shia.

References

Arabic words and phrases
Salah
Salah terminology